Famelica pacifica is a species of sea snail, a marine gastropod mollusk in the family Raphitomidae.

Description

Distribution
This marine species occurs in the Northwest Pacific.

References

External links
 

pacifica
Gastropods described in 1987